Trinity Methodist Church may refer to:

United Kingdom
 Trinity Methodist Church, Castleford
 Trinity Methodist Church, Harrogate
 Trinity Methodist Church, Hillsborough
 Trinity Methodist Church, Wood Green

United States
(by state)
Trinity Methodist Church (Denver, Colorado), a Denver Landmark
Trinity Methodist Church (Savannah, Georgia)
 Trinity Methodist Church (Idaho Falls, Idaho), listed on the NRHP in Idaho
 Trinity Methodist Church (Beacon, New York), listed on the NRHP in New York
 Trinity Methodist Church (Elizabethtown, North Carolina), listed on the NRHP in North Carolina
 Nast Trinity United Methodist Church, Cincinnati, Ohio
 Trinity Methodist Church (Richmond, Virginia), listed on the NRHP in Virginia

See also
 Trinity Church (disambiguation)
 Trinity Methodist Episcopal Church (disambiguation)